The 1963 Diamond "D" Championship the Canadian women's curling championship was held from February 25 to 28, 1963 at the St. Andrew's Curling Club in Saint John, New Brunswick.

Team New Brunswick, who was skipped by Mabel DeWare won the event by finishing the round robin with an 8-1 record. This was New Brunswick's first championship. This was also the first time in which a team won the championship on their home soil.

British Columbia and Ontario finished tied for second with 7-2 records, necessitating a tiebreaker between the two teams to determine the runner-up. British Columbia won runner-up as they defeated Ontario 6-4. This was also the first tiebreaker that was scheduled for 10 ends as the previous tiebreakers in 1961 were scheduled for 12 ends.

Teams
The teams are listed as follows:

Round robin standings
Source:

Round robin results
Source:

Draw 1 
Monday, February 25

Draw 2 
Monday, February 25

Draw 3 
Tuesday, February 26

Draw 4 
Tuesday, February 26

Draw 5 
Tuesday, February 26

Draw 6 
Wednesday, February 27

Draw 7 
Wednesday, February 27

Draw 8 
Thursday, February 28

Draw 9 
Thursday, February 28

Tiebreaker
Friday, March 1

Records
 Ontario's 14-13 victory over eventual champion New Brunswick in Draw 2 set the record the most combined points scored between two teams in a single game (27).
 Draw 5 saw the following records set or tied:
 British Columbia's 16-0 win over Manitoba was the first time that a team scored a shutout in the Canadian women's championship. To date, the 16 points scored by British Columbia is the most points ever scored by a winning team in a shutout.
 Saskatchewan's steal of 6 points in the fifth end tied the record for most stolen points scored in a single end.
 Quebec's 7 points in the sixth end against Nova Scotia set the record for most points scored in a single end. This record has since been matched three times (and ).

References

Diamond D Championship, 1963
Scotties Tournament of Hearts
Curling competitions in Saint John, New Brunswick
Diamond D Championship
Diamond D Championship
Diamond D Championship
Diamond D Championship